CNN Philippines Balitaan Kasama si Pinky Webb (simply "Balitaan" (lit. News)) is the flagship Filipino language noontime newscast of CNN Philippines. It premiered on April 4, 2016, and airs on weekdays at 12:00 NN PST. Balitaan took over the timeslot of the original noontime edition of CNN Philippines Newsroom and is anchored by Pinky Webb.

Background

It is the first ever Filipino language newscast of CNN Philippines, after the almost 1-year run of its predecessor, the original 12 noon edition of Newsroom. Balitaan is the second locally produced program in Filipino language next to now-defunct public service program Serbisyo All Access.

Balitaan is unique among other midday and afternoon newscasts on CNN Philippines, as it is airs on its normal format despite any live rolling coverage (such as Senate hearings or important developing stories) that might pre-empt other newscasts in their respective timeslots. Rolling coverage continues after the newscast in case the former is needed to provide added information.

Anchor
Pinky Webb

Substitute Anchors
Joyce Ilas (substitute anchor for Webb; also a reporter)
Ruth Cabal (substitute anchor for Webb; also a reporter)
Mai Rodriguez (substitute anchor for Webb)
Menchu Antigua-Macapagal (substitute anchor for Webb)
Amelyn Veloso (substitute anchor for Webb; now deceased)

Segments
Balitang Abroad (World Headlines)
Balitang Probinsya (Regional News)
Balitang Patok (Features)
Balitang Sports (Sports)
Balitang Showbiz (Entertainment)

See also
 List of programs broadcast by CNN Philippines

References

Philippine television news shows
2016 Philippine television series debuts
CNN Philippines original programming
CNN Philippines
CNN Philippines News and Current Affairs
Filipino-language television shows